Fábio Rogério Maldonado (born 17 March 1980) is a Brazilian professional mixed martial artist and boxer currently competing in the light heavyweight division of Fight Nights Global. A professional MMA competitor since 2000, he has also competed for the UFC.

Boxing career
Simultaneous to becoming a mixed martial artist fighter, Maldonado also competed professionally as a boxer in his native Brazil, making his professional boxing debut in April 2002, after an amateur career of 40-5 with 27 knockouts.  After his release from the UFC, Maldonado returned to professional boxing. He won his return fight with a round 1 TKO over Robson Bambu. Within less than a month, he proceeded to knock out Alessandro Bernardo in the first round with one punch.

Mixed martial arts career

Early career
Maldonado made his professional mixed martial arts debut in September 2000 and also began training in Brazilian jiu-jitsu the same year. During the first eight years of his career, he competed exclusively in his native Brazil, and made his North American debut in November 2008.

In the decade previous to his debut with the Ultimate Fighting Championship, Maldonado compiled a record of 17-3. Notable victories from this period include Vitor Miranda and two TKO victories over Maiquel Falcão.

Ultimate Fighting Championship
Maldonado made his UFC debut at UFC 120 against James McSweeney and won by TKO after 48 seconds of round 3.

Maldonado lost to Kyle Kingsbury via unanimous decision on 4 June 2011 at The Ultimate Fighter 13 Finale. Despite the loss, Maldonado won the Fight of the Night bonus.

Maldonado was expected to face Aaron Rosa at UFC Live: Cruz vs. Johnson. but he was forced to pull out of the bout due to an injury.

Maldonado was expected to face UFC newcomer Caio Magalhaes on 14 January 2012 at UFC 142, but had to pull out from this bout due to a rib injury.

For his third UFC fight, Maldonado faced Igor Pokrajac on 15 May 2012 at UFC on Fuel TV: The Korean Zombie vs. Poirier. Even though Maldonado rocked Pokrajac on several occasions, he lost the back-and-forth fight via unanimous decision.

Maldonado was expected to face UFC newcomer Jorgen Kruth at UFC on Fuel TV 5. However, Kruth abruptly retired from MMA and Maldonado was briefly linked to a bout with Cyrille Diabate on 17 November 2012 at UFC 154. However, Maldonado stepped up and faced Glover Teixeira on 13 October 2012 at UFC 153, replacing an injured Quinton Jackson. Maldonado absorbed a tremendous amount of punishment on the ground, which was so brutal it earned "Beatdown of the Year" honors from Sherdog.com.  Maldonado ultimately lost the fight at the end of the second round, when the doctor deemed him unable to continue.

Maldonado faced Roger Hollett on 18 May 2013 at UFC on FX 8. He won the fight via unanimous decision.

Maldonado next faced Joey Beltran on 9 October 2013 at UFC Fight Night 29. He won the back-and-forth fight via split decision.

Maldonado faced Gian Villante on 23 March 2014 at UFC Fight Night 38. After losing the first round to Villante, Maldonado rallied back to win the next two rounds utilizing his boxing and won the bout via unanimous decision (29–27, 29–28, and 29–28).

Maldonado faced Stipe Miocic in a heavyweight bout on 31 May 2014 at The Ultimate Fighter Brazil 3 Finale, replacing Junior dos Santos. He lost the fight by TKO due to punches early in the first round.

Maldonado faced Hans Stringer on 25 October 2014 at UFC 179. He won the fight via TKO in the second round.  The win also earned Maldonado his first Performance of the Night bonus award.

Maldonado was expected to face returning veteran Quinton Jackson on 25 April 2015 at UFC 186. However, on 7 April Jackson was removed from the card after his most recent employer, Bellator MMA, was granted an injunction by a New Jersey Superior Court judge preventing him from competing for the UFC after it was alleged that he breached a deal signed in June 2013. On 21 April a judge in the Superior Court of New Jersey's Appellate Division overturned the injunction against Jackson, allowing him to compete for the UFC.  The bout took place at a catchweight of 215 lbs. Maldonado lost the fight by unanimous decision.

Maldonado was expected to face Tom Lawlor on 7 November 2015 at UFC Fight Night 77. However, Lawlor was forced from the bout with injury and replaced by Corey Anderson. He lost the one sided fight by unanimous decision and was subsequently released from the promotion.

Fight Nights Global

Maldonado made his Fight Nights Global debut facing Pride and Strikeforce vet Fedor Emelianenko on 17 June 2016 at "Fight Nights Global 50" competing for a regional promotion in Russia. Despite dropping and nearly finishing Emelianenko on multiple occasions in the first round, Emelianenko rallied over the last two rounds and was awarded a controversial majority decision victory. 4 of 5 media outlets scored the bout a draw. All three judges being appointed by the Russian MMA Union was seen as a conflict of interest. In turn, in mid-July, the World MMA Association (WMMAA) said they declared the fight a draw. However, the official result will not be overturned.

In the second fight for the promotion, he faced Mikhail Mokhnatkin at Fight Nights Global 52 on 1 October 2016. He lost the fight via unanimous decision.

Maldonado faced Abdul-Khamid-Davlyatov at Fight Nights Global 60 on 5 March 2017. He won the fight via technical knockout in the first round.

Maldonado faced Kurban Omarov at Fight Nights Global 73 on 4 September 2017. He won the fight via submission in the third round to win the vacant FNG Light Heavyweight championship.

In the first defense of his title, Maldonado faced Nikita Krylov on 19 May 2018 at Fight Nights Global 87. He lost the fight via knockout in the second round.

Rizin FF
After the stint in FNG, Maldonado signed a one-fight contract with the Rizin Fighting Federation. He made his promotional debut in a non-title bout against Rizin FF Light Heavyweight champion Jiří Procházka at Rizin 19 on 12 October 2019. He lost the fight via TKO in the first round.

Next, he faced Pelu Adetola at Serbian Battle Championships 27 on March 14, 2020. He won the bout via unanimous decision.

Maldonado challenged Chi Lewis-Parry for the UAE Warriors Heavyweight Championship at UAE Warriors 13 on September 25, 2020. He lost the fight via TKO in the first round.

He faced Eli Reger Schablatura Pinto at Gladiator Combat Fight 53 on October 24, 2020. He won the fight via first-round technical knockout.

Maldonado was next expected to face Malik Merad at Arena FC 2 on December 12, 2020, but the whole event was postponed due to multiple COVID-19 cases.

He then faced Gabriel Kanabo at Samurai FC 25 on May 28, 2021. He won the bout via first-round technical knockout.

He challenged Sergei Kharitonov for the Parus FC Heavyweight Championship at an Parus FC event on November 6, 2021. He lost the bout via TKO in the first round.

Maldonado faced Kirill Sidelnikov on Ural FC 1 on July 1, 2022. He lost the bout via TKO in the first round.

Championships and accomplishments

Mixed martial arts
Fight Nights Global
FNG Light Heavyweight Championship (One time)
Ultimate Fighting Championship
Fight of the Night (One time) vs. Kyle Kingsbury
Performance of the Night (One time) vs. Hans Stringer

Boxing
Universal Boxing Council
UBC Iberian-American Heavyweight Championship (One time)
Liga Paulista de Boxe Profissional
São Paulo State Heavyweight Championship (One time)
Confederação Brasileira de Boxe
Brazil Amateur National Championship (1998, 1999, 2000)
Federação Paulista de Boxe
São Paulo Amateur State Championship (2000, 2001)
São Paulo Amateur State Championship Runner-up (1999)
2001 Jogos Abertos do Interior Amateur Tournament Gold Medalist
2001 Golden Gloves Amateur Tournament Gold Medalist
1999 Jogos Abertos do Interior Amateur Tournament Gold Medalist
1998 Forja de Campeões Amateur Tournament Gold Medalist
1998 Jogos Abertos do Interior Amateur Tournament Gold Medalist
1997 Jogos Abertos do Interior Amateur Tournament Gold Medalist

Mixed martial arts record

|-
| Loss
|align=center| 28–17
|Kirill Sidelnikov
| TKO (punches)
|Ural FC 1
|
|align=center| 1
|align=center| 0:45
|Perm, Russia
|
|-
| Loss
| align=center| 28–16
| Sergei Kharitonov
| TKO (punches)
| MFP Parus Fight Championship
| 
| align=center| 1
| align=center| 3:28
| Dubai, United Arab Emirates
| 
|-
|Win
|align=center|28–15
|Gabriel Kanabo
|TKO (punches)
|Samurai FC 25
|
|align=center|1
|align=center|1:47
|Curitiba, Brazil
|
|-
|Win
|align=center|27–15
|Eli Reger Schablatura Pinto
|TKO (punches)
|Gladiator Combat Fight 53
|
|align=center|1
|align=center|3:32
|Paraná, Brazil
|
|-
|Loss
|align=center|26–15
|Chi Lewis-Parry
|KO (elbows)
|UAE Warriors 13
|
|align=center|1
|align=center|1:08
|Abu Dhabi, UAE
|
|-
|Win
|align=center|26–14
|Pelu Adetola
|Decision (unanimous)
|Serbian Battle Championship 27
|
|align=center|3
|align=center|5:00
|Vrbas, Serbia
|
|-
|Loss
|align=center|25–14
|Jiří Procházka
|KO (punches)
|Rizin 19
|
|align=center|1
|align=center|1:49
|Osaka, Japan
|
|-
| Win
|align=center|25–13
|Thiago Silva Batista
|KO (punch)
|Vikings Fight Club 5 - Balada Fight
|
|align=center|1
|align=center|1:37
|Campinas, Brazil
|
|-
| Loss
|align=center|24–13
|Ivan Shtyrkov
|TKO (punches)
|RCC 4
|
|align=center|2
|align=center|1:23
|Ekaterinburg, Russia
|
|-
| Loss
|align=center|24–12
|Nikita Krylov
|KO (punch)
|Fight Nights Global 87: Khachatryan vs. Queally
|
|align=center|2
|align=center|3:33
|Rostov-on-Don, Russia
|
|-
| Win
|align=center|24–11
|Kurban Omarov
|Submission (guillotine choke)
|Fight Nights Global 73: Aliev vs. Brandão
|
|align=center|3
|align=center|3:01
|Kaspiysk, Russia
|
|-
| Win
|align=center|23–11
|Abdul-Khamid Davlyatov
|TKO (punches)
|Fight Nights Global 60: Aryshev vs. Khasanov
|
|align=center|1
|align=center|4:20
|Dushanbe, Tajikistan
|
|-
| Loss
|align=center|22–11
|Mikhail Mokhnatkin
|Decision (unanimous)
|Fight Nights Global 52: Mokhnatkin vs. Maldonado
|
|align=center|3
|align=center|5:00 
|Nizhnevartovsk, Russia
|
|-
| Loss
|align=center|22–10
|Fedor Emelianenko
|Decision (majority)
|Fight Nights Global 50: Fedor vs. Maldonado
|
|align=center|3
|align=center|5:00 
|St. Petersburg, Russia
|
|-
|Loss
|align=center|22–9
|Corey Anderson
|Decision (unanimous)
|UFC Fight Night: Belfort vs. Henderson 3
|
|align=center|3
|align=center|5:00
|São Paulo, Brazil
| 
|-
|Loss
|align=center|22–8
|Quinton Jackson
|Decision (unanimous)
|UFC 186
|
|align=center|3
|align=center|5:00
|Montreal, Quebec, Canada
|
|-
|Win
|align=center|22–7
|Hans Stringer
|TKO (punches)
|UFC 179
|
|align=center|2
|align=center|4:06
|Rio de Janeiro, Brazil
|
|-
|Loss
|align=center|21–7
|Stipe Miocic
| TKO (punches) 
|The Ultimate Fighter Brazil 3 Finale: Miocic vs. Maldonado
| 
|align=center|1
|align=center|0:35
|São Paulo, Brazil
|
|-
|Win
|align=center|21–6
|Gian Villante
| Decision (unanimous)
|UFC Fight Night: Shogun vs. Henderson 2
| 
|align=center|3
|align=center|5:00
|Natal, Brazil
|
|-
|Win
|align=center|20–6
|Joey Beltran
| Decision (split)
|UFC Fight Night: Maia vs. Shields
|
|align=center|3
|align=center|5:00
|Barueri, Brazil
|
|-
|Win
|align=center|19–6
|Roger Hollett
| Decision (unanimous)
|UFC on FX: Belfort vs. Rockhold
|
|align=center|3
|align=center|5:00
|Jaraguá do Sul, Brazil
|
|-
|Loss
|align=center|18–6
|Glover Teixeira
| TKO (doctor stoppage)
|UFC 153
|
|align=center|2
|align=center|5:00
|Rio de Janeiro, Brazil
|
|-
|Loss
|align=center|18–5
|Igor Pokrajac
| Decision (unanimous)
|UFC on Fuel TV: The Korean Zombie vs. Poirier
|
|align=center|3
|align=center|5:00
|Fairfax, Virginia, United States
|
|-
|Loss
|align=center|18–4
|Kyle Kingsbury
| Decision (unanimous)
|The Ultimate Fighter: Team Lesnar vs. Team dos Santos Finale
|
|align=center|3
|align=center|5:00
|Las Vegas, Nevada, United States
|
|-
|Win
|align=center|18–3
|James McSweeney
|TKO (punches)
|UFC 120
|
|align=center|3
|align=center|0:48
|London, England
|Light Heavyweight debut.
|-
|Win
|align=center|17–3
|Nelson Martins
|TKO (punches)
|First Class Fight 4
|
|align=center|1
|align=center|0:40
|São Paulo, Brazil
|
|-
|Win
|align=center|16–3
|Jackson Mora
|Submission (guillotine choke)
|Memorial Fight Qualifying
|
|align=center|1
|align=center|1:19
|Santos, Brazil
|
|-
|Win
|align=center|15–3
|Jessie Gibbs
|Submission (punches)
|Bitetti Combat MMA 7
|
|align=center|2
|align=center|2:52
|Rio de Janeiro, Brazil
|
|-
|Win
|align=center|14–3
|Alessandro Leal
|TKO (punches)
|Combat Power Championship
|
|align=center|1
|align=center|4:57
|Piracicaba, Brazil
|
|-
|Win
|align=center|13–3
|Fernando Tressino
|TKO (corner stoppage)
|Bitetti Combat MMA 5
|
|align=center|2
|align=center|5:00
|Barueri, Brazil
|
|-
|Win
|align=center|12–3
|Vitor Miranda
| Decision (unanimous)
|Bitetti Combat MMA 4
|
|align=center|3
|align=center|5:00
|Rio de Janeiro, Brazil
|
|-
|Win
|align=center|11–3
|Edgard Castaldelli Filho
|TKO (punches)
|Predador FC 12
|
|align=center|2
|align=center|4:44
|São Paulo, Brazil
|
|-
|Win
|align=center|10–3
|Shaton Vaughn
|Submission (guillotine choke)
|Fightworld 16: International
|
|align=center|1
|align=center|4:48
|Albuquerque, New Mexico, United States
|
|-
|Win
|align=center|9–3
|Maiquel Falcão
|TKO (punches)
|Predador FC 9
|
|align=center|2
|align=center|1:52
|São Paulo, Brazil
|
|-
|Win
|align=center|8–3
|Renato Matos
|TKO (punches)
|Predador FC 7
|
|align=center|1
|align=center|0:50
|São Paulo, Brazil
|
|-
|Loss
|align=center|7–3
|Alexandre Ferreira
|Submission (kneebar)
|Mo Team League: Final
|
|align=center|1
|align=center|0:27
|São Paulo, Brazil
|
|-
|Win
|align=center|7–2
|Vitor Miranda
|Decision (unanimous)
|Mo Team League 2
|
|align=center|3
|align=center|5:00
|São Paulo, Brazil
|
|-
|Win
|align=center|6–2
|Maiquel Falcão
|TKO (punches)
|Circuito Mariliense MMA
|
|align=center|3
|align=center|0:46
|Marilia, Brazil
|
|-
|Win
|align=center|5–2
|Ildemar Alcântara
|Decision (unanimous)
|Predador Kamae 2
|
|align=center|5
|align=center|5:00
|Florianópolis, Brazil
|
|-
|Win
|align=center|4–2
|Cleisson Mamute
|TKO (punches)
|Pantanal Combat
|
|align=center|2
|align=center|2:01
|São Paulo, Brazil
|
|-
|Win
|align=center|3–2
|Bruno Alves
|TKO (punches)
|Clube da Luta 1
|
|align=center|2
|align=center|4:54
|Salvador, Brazil
|
|-
|Loss
|align=center|2–2
|Alessandro Leal
|Submission (kneebar)
|Meca World Vale Tudo 5
|
|align=center|1
|align=center|5:22
|Curitiba, Brazil
|
|-
|Loss
|align=center|2–1
|Omni Santos
|Decision (unanimous)
|Surf Fight Circuit: Day 2
|
|align=center|2
|align=center|10:00
|Brasília, Brazil
|
|-
|Win
|align=center|2–0
|Augusto Menezes Santos
|TKO (punches)
|Surf Fight Circuit: Day 1
|
|align=center|2
|align=center|3:03
|Brasília, Brazil
|
|-
|Win
|align=center|1–0
|Robson Parazinho
|TKO (punches)
|Surf Fight Circuit: Day 1
|
|align=center|1
|align=center|2:21
|Brasília, Brazil
|

Professional boxing record

See also
 List of male mixed martial artists

References

External links
 
 
 

1980 births
Living people
Brazilian male mixed martial artists
Heavyweight boxers
Heavyweight mixed martial artists
Mixed martial artists utilizing boxing
Mixed martial artists utilizing Brazilian jiu-jitsu
Sportspeople from São Paulo
Brazilian male boxers
Brazilian practitioners of Brazilian jiu-jitsu
Ultimate Fighting Championship male fighters